Maitipage Athula Rohitha Samarasekera (born August 5, 1961) is a Sri Lankan Australian cricket coach and former cricketer who is currently working as a cricket coach in Australia. He was a hard hitting opening batsman and a medium fast bowler, who played four Tests and 39 ODIs between 1983 and 1994.

Samarasekera was a member of the Sri Lankan cricket teams participated for the cricket world cups in 1983 and 1992.

Early years
Athula Samarasekera started his cricket career at Mahinda College, Galle, where he had his education. He captained his college cricket team at the annual Richmond–Mahinda Cricket Encounter in 1981. Then he joined the Colombo Cricket Club, where he subsequently became a permanent fixture of the team.

International career
Samarasekera made his One Day International debut at Swansea against Pakistan during the 1983 Cricket World Cup and made his Test debut 5 years later against England at the Lord's in August 1988. He scored a half century in the second innings of his first test and took three wickets in the match, though Sri Lanka went on to lose the game by  7 wickets.

Samarasekera was one of the first openers to successfully take the advantage of field restrictions by hitting air-borne shots in ODI cricket. His most memorable ODI performance came in the 1992 cricket world cup, when he scored a brisk 75 against Zimbabwe, reaching his half century in just 31 balls in the first ever successful run chase of over 300 runs in ODI history.

Tall and correct, he was an aggressive batsman and more than handy bowler, but failed to make his mark in international cricket with the limited opportunities he got. His elder brother Anura Samarasekera was also a first class cricketer in Sri Lanka.

After cricket
Samarasekera chose to end his international career in 1994 by deciding to take up professional cricket in Bangladesh, since he never had the opportunity to fully establish a permanent position in the team.

Athula now lives in Hampton Park, a suburb of Melbourne. He and his wife Thilani have two sons, Sikhi and Seth, and a daughter, Seenai. He coaches young cricketers in the arts of batting and bowling.

International awards

One-Day International Cricket

Man of the Match awards

References

External links
 First ever successful 300+ run chase in ODI cricket
 
 Athula Samarasekera at CricketArchive
 "There's an international cricketer in my back garden"

1961 births
Living people
Sri Lanka Test cricketers
Sri Lanka One Day International cricketers
Sri Lankan cricketers
Colombo Cricket Club cricketers
Sri Lankan emigrants to Australia
Alumni of Mahinda College
Ruhuna cricketers
Cricketers from Galle
Sinhalese sportspeople
Australian cricket coaches